Onelys Marquel Alvarado Arenas (born 20 August 1993) is a Panamanian footballer who plays as a defender for the Panama women's national team.

International career
Alvarado appeared in three matches for Panama at the 2018 CONCACAF Women's Championship.

See also
 List of Panama women's international footballers

References

1993 births
Living people
Panamanian women's footballers
Women's association football defenders
Panama women's international footballers